The Transitional Government of the Democratic Republic of Congo was tasked with moving from the state riven by the Second Congo War (1998–2003) to a government based upon a constitution agreed on by consensus. In 2001, President Laurent Kabila was assassinated, and his son Joseph Kabila was named head of state.

Background
In July 2002, the Pretoria Accord was signed on withdrawal of foreign forces. In October 2002, Joseph Kabila negotiated the withdrawal of Rwandan forces occupying eastern Congo. Two months later, the 'Global and All-Inclusive Agreement' was signed by all remaining warring parties to end the fighting and establish a government of national unity.

Prunier writes:
For a few months after the signing of the Sun City Agreement, things had stagnated as the delegates to the Intra-Congolese Dialogue kept debating in Pretoria about how to turn the piece of paper they had signed into some kind of reality. On April 1, 2003, they finally adopted the draft constitution which had been presented to them on March 6, and they agreed upon the outline of a transitional government.

History

On April 7, 2003, Joseph Kabila was sworn in as transitional president. And on the next day, the last of the four agreed vice-presidents was named, Azarias Ruberwa for the RCD-G. He joined Abdoulaye Yerodia Ndombasi for Kabila's government; Jean-Pierre Bemba for the MLC;  and Arthur Z'ahidi Ngoma for the political opposition.

The first cabinet was announced on July 1.

On July 17 2003, the four vice-presidents of the DRC's two-year transitional government took the oath of office in Kinshasa, but a day later on July 18, transitional government officials designated by the RCD-Goma and the MLC refused to take the oath of office because it included swearing allegiance to President Joseph Kabila.

Over the course of September, a reinforced MONUC presence carried out the "Bunia, weapon-free zone" operation to demilitarize the province.  They were partially successful, though conflicts continue to permeate the region.

The transitional period came to end with the completion of the 2006 general election and the swearing in of Kabila as president on 6 December 2006.

See also
2000s in the Democratic Republic of the Congo
Transitional National Assembly of the Democratic Republic of the Congo

References

External links 
International Center for Transitional Justice, Democratic Republic of the Congo
CIA World Factbook
Chiefs of State and Cabinet Members of Foreign Governments - DRC

United States Holocaust Memorial Museum - Ripples of Genocide: Journey through Eastern Congo, testimonials from foreign visitors from 2002 and 2003

Politics of the Democratic Republic of the Congo
Political organisations based in the Democratic Republic of the Congo
Government of the Democratic Republic of the Congo
Congo, Transitional Government of the Democratic Republic of the